The 1973 Texas Longhorns football team represented the University of Texas at Austin in the 1973 NCAA Division I football season.  The Longhorns finished the regular season with an 8–2 record and lost to Nebraska in the Cotton Bowl Classic.

Schedule

Personnel

Season summary

at Miami (FL)

Texas Tech

Wake Forest

vs Oklahoma

Worst loss in Darrell Royal's coaching career

at Arkansas

Rice

at SMU

Baylor

TCU

at Texas A&M

Cotton Bowl (vs Nebraska)

References

Texas
Texas Longhorns football seasons
Southwest Conference football champion seasons
Texas Longhorns football